Bagley may refer to:

Places

United Kingdom
 Bagley, Shrewsbury, England
 Bagley, Shropshire, England
 Bagley, Somerset, England
 Bagley, West Yorkshire, England
 Bagley Brook, in Shropshire, England
 Bagley Wood, in Oxfordshire, England

United States
 Bagley, Alabama
 Bagley, Iowa
 Bagley Township, Michigan
 Bagley, Minnesota
 Bagley, Wisconsin
 Bagley, Oconto County, Wisconsin
 Bagley, Utah - location of the Bagley train wreck

Other uses
 Bagley (surname)
 Bagley Wright (1924–2011), American real estate developer and philanthropist
 Bagley-class destroyer
 USS Bagley, several ships by that name
 Bagley (Argentine company), a brand owned by Argentine food company Arcor